Nomagugu Simelane-Zulu (born 22 August 1976) is a South African lawyer and African National Congress (ANC) politician who has been serving as the KwaZulu-Natal MEC (Member of the Executive Council) for Health since May 2019. She became a Member of the KwaZulu-Natal Legislature in May 2014. She was the chair of the legislature's Agriculture Portfolio Committee from 2014 to 2019. Simelane-Zulu was previously involved in the African National Congress Youth League (ANCYL).

Early life and education
Nomagugu Simelane was born on 22 August 1976 in Dobsonville, Johannesburg, in the former Transvaal Province. She obtained a BA degree in law and then an LLB degree from the University of Natal, now the University of KwaZulu-Natal. She holds a certificate in Governance from the University of the Witwatersrand. Simelane-Zulu is currently studying towards a master's degree in political science.

Political career
Simelane-Zulu joined the ANCYL at the age of 16 in 1992 and was branch treasurer of the youth league in Dobsonville from 1992 to 1993. While studying at the University of Natal's Pietermaritzburg campus, she was chair of the South African Students Congress from 1997 to 1998. She was then chairperson of the university's ANC Youth League branch from 1999 until 2001. She was the secretary of the university's Law Student Society from 1999 to 2000.

Simelane-Zulu later became chairperson of the Black Lawyers Association at the university and was in the post from 2000 to 2001. She was branch secretary from 2002 to 2004.

She was the provincial treasurer of the ANC Youth League from 2003 to 2010. From 2010 until 2011, she was the regional treasurer of the ANC's Abaqulusi  branch. She was elected regional chairperson and served in the post from 2011 to 2014. She was elected a member of the ANC Provincial Executive Committee in 2015.

Simelane-Zulu was elected as an MPL in May 2014 and was the chairperson of the legislature's Agriculture Committee until 2019. Premier Sihle Zikalala appointed her as MEC for Health in May 2019.

In September 2021, Simelane-Zulu issued a public apology after she and her guests defied COVID-19 regulations during a surprise birthday party for her in August. The Democratic Alliance in KwaZulu-Natal laid criminal charges against her.

Prior to the ANC's provincial elective conference, the ANC in the eThekwini region, the party's largest region in KwaZulu-Natal, endorsed Simelane-Zulu's campaign for deputy provincial chairperson. She was on ANC MPL and candidate for provincial chairperson, Siboniso Duma's "Taliban" slate, a group of candidates allied to former president Jacob Zuma. On 23 July 2022, Simelane-Zulu was elected as the deputy provincial chairperson of the ANC, defeating Education MEC Kwazi Mshengu in a vote that went 927–661 as the "Taliban" slate made a clean sweep of all the provincial leadership positions.

Zikalala resigned as premier on 5 August 2022 and Finance MEC Nomusa Dube-Ncube was elected to replace him. On 11 August 2022, Dube-Ncube appointed her executive council, in which Simelane-Zulu remains as the MEC for Health.

Personal life
Simelane was married. She resides in Newcastle, KwaZulu-Natal.

References

External links
Nomagugu Simelane-Zulu – People's Assembly
Hon. N Simelane-Zulu – KZN Legislature
Nomagugu Simelane-Zulu, Ms – South African Government

Living people
1976 births
Zulu people
People from Johannesburg
Members of the KwaZulu-Natal Legislature
People from Newcastle, KwaZulu-Natal
African National Congress politicians
University of Natal alumni
South African women lawyers
20th-century South African politicians
21st-century South African politicians
Women members of provincial legislatures of South Africa
University of the Witwatersrand alumni
21st-century South African women politicians
21st-century South African lawyers